Maurice Carême (12 May 1899 – 13 January 1978) was a Belgian francophone poet, best known for his simple writing style and children's poetry. His work was part of the literature event in the art competition at the 1928 Summer Olympics.

Life and career

Carême was born in Walloon Brabant in Wavre, then a rural part of Belgium. Although he grew up in a family of modest means – his father was a housepainter, and his mother a shopkeeper.  Carême had a happy childhood, which would be reflected in his work.

Carême attended school in his hometown, and in 1914 was awarded a scholarship to attend Normal School in Tienen. It was at this time that he began writing poetry. In 1918, he graduated from Normal School and was assigned a primary school teacher's position in Anderlecht, near Brussels.

Carême's poetry progressively took on a greater place in his life, and in 1943 he resigned from his teaching profession to commit himself fully to writing. He also translated works of Dutch poets into French.

Carême died in Anderlecht. At his request, he was buried in Wavre. His wife died in 1990. His home in Anderlecht, "La Maison Blanche", now houses the Musée Maurice Carême.

References

Bibliography 
 Maurice Nicoulin, Hommage à Maurice Carême, Vevey, Éditions Delta, 1978.
 Jacques Charles, Maurice Carême, coll. « Poètes d'aujourd'hui », Pierre Seghers éditeur, Paris, 1965
 Pierre Coran, Maurice Carême, collection Portraits, Pierre De Meyere éditeur, Bruxelles, 1966
 Jeannine Burny, « Le jour s'en va toujours trop tôt » : Sur les pas de Maurice Carême, Racine, 2007

External links 
 Les Musiciens et Maurice Carême 	
 Maurice Carême Museum
 Être poète

1899 births
1978 deaths
People from Wavre
Prince des poètes
Belgian poets in French
20th-century Belgian poets
Olympic competitors in art competitions